Sofie Goor (born 14 January 1977) is a road cyclist from Belgium. She represented her nation at the 2007 UCI Road World Championships.

References

External links
 profile at Procyclingstats.com

1977 births
Belgian female cyclists
Living people
Place of birth missing (living people)
People from Aarschot
Cyclists from Flemish Brabant